Spitfire Audio is an English technology company based in London that creates virtual instrument sample libraries used for music production. The company was founded in 2007 by professional composers Christian Henson and Paul Thomson.

Products
Henson and Thomson initially made their sample libraries available only to colleagues, but upon finding there was a larger market for the sample libraries founded Spitfire Audio in 2007.

Taking the form of digital audio plug-ins recorded by professional artists in recognised recording studios, Spitfire Audio's virtual instruments make available recordings of each note performed in multiple ways using multiple microphone positions. Composers and musicians play the virtual instrument within a digital audio workstation via MIDI to create new music.

Some Spitire Audio products utilize Spitfire's own interface with select performance specifics, while others utilize the Native Instruments Kontakt system. The purchase price of Spitfire Audio products includes the right to use the music produced commercially without further payment, with the original performers receiving both an initial fee and subsequent royalties from Spitfire Audio.

The recording sessions for the company's sample libraries are made in commercial studios such as AIR Lyndhurst in Hampstead and Abbey Road Studios in St John's Wood. Similarly, Spitfire Audio's recordings of the BBC Symphony Orchestra were made at the orchestra's base in the BBC's Maida Vale Studios. The company also operates their own recording studio at their premises in Tileyard London.

In addition to direct recordings of individual and groups of instruments, Spitfire has collaborated with noted film composer Hans Zimmer, Red Hot Chili Peppers drummer Chad Smith, Ólafur Arnalds, Roger Taylor of Queen, Eric Whitacre, guitarist Leo Abrahams, and posthumously with the explorer and musician David Fanshawe, in creating mixed audio productions for television and film use.
Alongside the company's retail products, it also releases occasional free products under the 'LABS' brand.

Pianobook

On Piano day in 2018, Henson launched a website and YouTube channel called Pianobook. Run by a small group of volunteers, the channel is dedicated to crating and sharing sampled instruments for free. As of April 2021, over 500 'instruments' had been released via the Pianobook YouTube channel.

SA Recordings
The company runs their own record label, SARecordings, to offer recordings using Spitfire Audio products by selected composers, such as Alev Lenz's third studio album 3, which was the label’s first release. Additionally, Spitfire Audio has announced plans for a series of unique sample libraries to be released in conjunction with their artists’ album releases.

See also
 Blake Robinson Synthetic Orchestra
 The Mrs Mills Piano
 Timelapse of the Future
 Jeremiah Fraites

References

External links
 

Recording studios in London
2007 establishments in the United Kingdom
Software samplers
Software synthesizers
Software companies of England